The 2007–08 Logan Cup was a first-class cricket competition held in Zimbabwe from 17 April 2008 – 17 May 2008. It was won by Northerns, who won all four of their matches to top the table with 75 points.

Points table

References

2008 in cricket
2008 in Zimbabwean sport
Domestic cricket competitions in 2007–08
Logan Cup